State Route 262 (SR 262) is an east–west state highway in Middle Tennessee. it traverses Macon and Jackson counties.

Route description 
SR 262 begins in Macon County as a secondary highway at an intersection with SR 52 just east of Lafayette. It turns southeastward towards Willette crossing SR 56 and SR 80. It runs concurrently with SR 56 from Gidds Crossroads to near Goose Horn. SR 262 enters Jackson County close to the point where Macon and Jackson counties meet Smith County, but falls short of the Smith County line.

SR 262 continues southeastward, and then runs concurrently with SR 85 for a short distance from Highland to Rough Point. SR 262 then becomes a primary highway and goes southeast to cross the Cumberland River and end on the west side of Gainesboro at a junction with SR 53.

History

Prior to 1982, SR 262 was designated SR 85A

Major intersections

References 

262
Transportation in Macon County, Tennessee
Transportation in Jackson County, Tennessee